Arachosinella is a genus of Asian dwarf spiders that was first described by J. Denis in 1958.  it contains only two species from Russia and Central Asia: A. oeroegensis and A. strepens.

See also
 List of Linyphiidae species

References

Araneomorphae genera
Linyphiidae
Spiders of Asia
Spiders of Russia